Kizray (Qıźray) is a rural locality (a village) in Pervomaysky Selsoviet, Meleuzovsky District, Bashkortostan, Russia. The population was 342 as of 2010. There are 6 streets.

Geography 
Kizray is located 17 km east of Meleuz (the district's administrative centre) by road. Samaro-Ivanovka is the nearest rural locality.

References 

Rural localities in Meleuzovsky District